Lea, Cottam, and Lea Town are villages in the City of Preston, Lancashire, England.  Together they form the civil parish of Lea, which has a population of 5,962. In 2011, the population increased to 6157.

Geography
The area is an electoral ward with Preston, represented by three councillors; the area is part of Fylde constituency.

Council
Lea and Cottam form Lea Ward of Preston City council, currently represented by three Conservative councillors, and together with Ingol forms Preston West division of Lancashire County Council, represented by one councillor, currently a Liberal Democrat

Community
The area is represented by Lea and Cottam Parish Council. Cottam is a former farming community now almost entirely consisting of new build housing.

Lea is also the name given to two areas of the western extremities of Preston; Lea Town (a village, despite its name) on the Fylde border, which had a population of 291 in 2011, and the suburban sprawl of Lea along the Blackpool Road through the city.

Lea Town and Lea were called English Lea and French Lea in the 11th to 13th centuries; "French" because there was a Norman landowner.

Demography
From the last census, in 2001, over 83% of the population regarded themselves as Christian, whilst the figure of 11.5% for retired people is one of the highest in the city.

Religion
There are several churches in Lea including Lea Methodist and St. Christopher's. St. Christopher's is home to 2nd Lea Scout Group.

History
The parish of Lea was formed on 1 April 1934 from part of the former parish of Lea Ashton Ingol and Cottam, which was formed in 1866.
Lea parish was part of Preston Rural District until its abolition in 1974. In 1974 the parish became part of the Borough of Preston, which became a city in 2002.

The area was served by Lea Road railway station between 1840 and 1938.

Notable people
Gordon Ashcroft, footballer

See also
Listed buildings in Lea, Lancashire

Gallery

References

Geography of the City of Preston
Civil parishes in Lancashire
Wards of Preston